The 1949–50 season was Real Madrid Club de Fútbol's 47th season in existence and the club's 18th consecutive season in the top flight of Spanish football.

Summary
During summer basque goalkeeper Juan Alonso arrived to the club from Ferrol along with him defender Joaquin Navarro was bought to Sabadell Shockingly the squad lost the 1950 Copa del Generalísimo Semi-finals stage 3–5 against underdogs Real Valladolid. Michael Keeping managed the team towards the first spot on round 8 and remained here until round 20, then the squad collapsed for the final rounds closing on the 4th place.

Squad

Transfers

Competitions

La Liga

Position by round

League table

Matches

Copa del Generalísimo

Semi-finals

Statistics

Squad statistics

Players statistics

References

Real Madrid CF seasons
Real Madrid CF